Taurence Duvael Chisholm (born in the 1960s) is an American former basketball player who is known for his collegiate career at the University of Delaware between 1984–85 and 1987–88. A point guard, Chisholm ended his career with 877 assists, which was the fourth-highest total in NCAA Division I history at the time of his graduation (as of 2014, he is 20th all-time). In 1985–86 he finished second in the nation in assists per game (apg), and his 8.0 apg average for his entire career ranks fifth all-time in Division I history.

The first portion of his high school career was spent at McDonogh School in Owings Mills, Maryland before he transferred to Paul Laurence Dunbar High School in Baltimore. He accepted a scholarship to play for the Delaware Fightin' Blue Hens in Newark, Delaware. As a freshman in 1984–85 he was named to the East Coast Conference (ECC) All Rookie Team. After compiling 200+ assists in each of his four seasons at Delaware (no other player in program history recorded 200+ in any single season), Chisholm was named a finalist for the Frances Pomeroy Naismith Award as a senior, which is given annually to the country's best male player who is 6-feet tall or shorter. That season he was also named a second team all-conference selection, and United Press International named him to their Little All-America team.

He had a brief stint in the now-defunct United States Basketball League for the Philadelphia Aces.

See also
 List of NCAA Division I men's basketball career assists leaders

References

1960s births
Living people
American men's basketball players
Basketball players from Baltimore
Delaware Fightin' Blue Hens men's basketball players
Point guards